Laksmipur is a village development committee in Kanchanpur District in  Sudurpashchim Province of south-western Nepal. The former  village development committee was converted into Municipality merging with existing Rampur Bilaspur, Laksmipur, Mahakali and Sripur village development committee on 18 May 2014. At the time of the 1991 Nepal census it had a population of 11,767.

References

Populated places in Kanchanpur District